Thierry Small (born 1 August 2004) is an English footballer who plays as a left-back for  club St Mirren, on loan from  club Southampton.

Small became the youngest player in Everton's history in January 2021, aged 16 years and 176 days, but turned professional with Southampton shortly after turning 17. He joined Port Vale on loan at the start of the 2022–23 season and was loaned to Scottish Premiership club St Mirren in January 2023.

Club career

Everton
Small spent time at West Bromwich Albion, before joining the academy at Everton at the age of 11. He made his first-team debut for Everton on 24 January 2021, coming on as a late substitute in a 3–0 FA Cup win over Sheffield Wednesday at Goodison Park. In doing so, he became the youngest player in Everton history at the age of 16 years and 176 days, breaking Jose Baxter's 2008 record by 15 days. However he feared not getting game-time under Carlo Ancelotti, with Lucas Digne and Niels Nkounkou ahead of him the first-team pecking order, and subsequently rejected the opportunity to turn professional at Everton at the age of 17 and instead became a free agent. Everton coach David Unsworth said that "we made him an unbelievable offer... but when a player doesn't want to be at your club, it's very difficult to try and keep him".

Southampton
On 24 August 2021, Small signed for Southampton on a three-year contract. Everton rejected Southampton's offer of £1.5 million compensation, leaving the case to be decided by a tribunal. Manager Ralph Hasenhüttl stated that "we have already signed a player this summer with good experience at left-back in Romain Perraud, and Thierry's arrival now gives us a very good balance and a strong additional option in that position". He scored for the under-21 team in their 4–0 victory at Crawley Town in the EFL Trophy on 9 November. He went on to be shortlisted for the November 2021 Premier League 2 Player of the Month award. He made his first-team debut for the club in the FA Cup on 5 February 2022, in a 2–1 win over Coventry City at St Mary's.

Loan to Port Vale
On 26 July 2022, Small joined EFL League One club Port Vale on a season-long loan deal. Manager Darrell Clarke experimented by playing him as a forward in the Staffordshire Senior Cup. He continued to play for the Southampton youth-team after not making the matchday squads at Vale Park. He was recalled to Southampton by new manager Nathan Jones on 11 November, with Clarke admitting that "for various reasons, he hasn't played the minutes that we would have liked" as the Vale had Mal Benning, Dan Jones and Liam McCarron to compete for the left-wing back position.

Loan to St Mirren
On 31 January 2023, Small joined Scottish Premiership club St Mirren on loan for the rest of the 2022–23 season. Manager Stephen Robinson said that his arrival would provide competition for Scott Tanser on the left-hand side.

International career
Small has represented England at youth international level. He appeared as a second-half substitute for the under-17 side in a friendly against Watford under-23s in March 2021. He made his debut for England U18s on 7 June 2022, during a 3–2 victory over Austria in Croatia. This was the first of three games he played in a four-team mini-tournament that England won.

Style of play
Small is a powerful and pacey left-back with good ball-striking ability and stamina. He is also able to play in central defence or on the left-wing.

Personal life
Small was born in England of Jamaican, Kittitian and Panamanian descent. He has a Panamanian grandfather. Small's uncle, Bryan Small, was a professional footballer who played for Aston Villa in the Premier League and other Football League clubs.

Career statistics

Club

References

2004 births
Living people
English footballers
England youth international footballers
English people of Panamanian descent
English sportspeople of Jamaican descent
English sportspeople of Saint Kitts and Nevis descent
Sportspeople from Solihull
Association football fullbacks
West Bromwich Albion F.C. players
Everton F.C. players
Southampton F.C. players
Port Vale F.C. players
St Mirren F.C. players
English Football League players
Scottish Professional Football League players
Black British sportspeople
Scottish Premier League players